Claxton is an unincorporated community in McMinn County, Tennessee, United States. Claxton used to have a community school but it closed in the 1970s. But it has a local volunteer fire department  and a Dollar General. 

References

Unincorporated communities in McMinn County, Tennessee
Unincorporated communities in Tennessee